Dinosaur Jr. is an American rock band formed in Amherst, Massachusetts in 1984. Originally called Dinosaur, the band was forced to change their name due to legal issues.

The band was founded by J Mascis (guitar, vocals, primary songwriter), Lou Barlow (bass, vocals), and Murph (drums). After three albums on independent labels, the band earned a reputation as one of the formative influences on American alternative rock. Creative tension led to Mascis firing Barlow, who later formed Sebadoh and Folk Implosion. His replacement, Mike Johnson, came aboard for three major-label albums. Murph eventually quit, with Mascis taking over drum duties on the band's albums before the group disbanded in 1997. The original lineup reformed in 2005, releasing five albums thereafter.

Mascis's drawling vocals and distinct guitar sound, hearkening back to 1960s and 1970s classic rock and characterized by extensive use of feedback and distortion, were highly influential in the alternative rock movement of the 1990s.

History

Formation
Mascis and Barlow played together, on drums and guitar respectively, in the hardcore punk band Deep Wound, formed in 1982 while the pair were attending high school in western Massachusetts. After high school, they began exploring slower yet still aggressive music like Black Sabbath, the Replacements, and Neil Young. Mascis's college friend Gerard Cosloy introduced him to psychedelic-influenced pop bands like Dream Syndicate, which Mascis in turn showed to Barlow. Barlow explained, "We loved speed metal ... and we loved wimpy-jangly stuff".

Deep Wound broke up in mid-1984. Cosloy had dropped out of the University of Massachusetts Amherst to focus on running his independent record label, Homestead Records. He promised Mascis that if he were to make a record, Homestead would release it. Mascis wrote a number of songs by himself and showed them to Barlow, to whom he offered the bassist position. Barlow described the songs as "...fucking brilliant...They were so far beyond. I was still into two-chord songs and basic stuff like 'I'm so sad.' While I was really into my own little tragedy, J was operating in this whole other panorama." Mascis enlisted vocalist Charlie Nakajima, also formerly of Deep Wound, and drummer Emmett Patrick Murphy (otherwise known as Murph) to complete the band. Mascis explained the concept behind the group as "ear-bleeding country."

The band was initially named Mogo, and they played their first show on the University of Massachusetts Amherst campus in the first week of September 1984. However, Nakajima used the performance to launch an extended anti-police tirade. Mascis was so appalled by Nakajima's behavior at the show that he disbanded the group the next day. A few days later, Mascis invited Barlow and Murph to form a new band without telling Nakajima. "I was kind of like too wimpy to kick him out, exactly," Mascis later admitted. "Communicating with people has been a constant problem in the band." The trio named themselves Dinosaur, and Mascis and Barlow took over lead vocal duties.

Dinosaur
Mascis took Cosloy up on his offer to release an album on Homestead, and Dinosaur recorded their debut album for $500 at a home studio in the woods outside Northampton, Massachusetts. Their debut album, Dinosaur, was released in 1985. Mascis wrote all of the songs. The vocals were done by Mascis in his trademark nasal drawl, which was often compared to singer Neil Young. Mascis would sing most or all of the lead vocals on all of their subsequent releases. The album did not make much of an impact commercially or critically: it sold only about 1,500 copies in its first year and was largely ignored by the majority of the music press.

After the record's release, Dinosaur would often drive to New York City to perform shows. The New York-based alternative rock band Sonic Youth was unimpressed by the first Dinosaur performance they saw, but after watching them play several months later, they approached the band declaring themselves fans. Sonic Youth invited Dinosaur to join them on tour in the American Northeast and northern Midwest in September 1986.

You're Living All Over Me
Dinosaur recorded much of their second album, You're Living All Over Me, with Sonic Youth engineer Wharton Tiers in New York. During the recording process, tension emerged between Mascis and Murph because Mascis had very specific ideas for the drum parts. Barlow recalled, "J controlled Murph's every drumbeat ... And Murph could not handle that. Murph wanted to kill J for the longest time." Gerard Cosloy was excited by the completed album, but was devastated when Mascis told him the band was going to release it on California-based SST Records. Mascis was reluctant to sign a two-album deal with Homestead, but Cosloy felt betrayed, "There was no way I couldn't take it personally." After the album's completion Mascis moved to New York, leaving the rest of the band feeling alienated.

You're Living All Over Me was released in 1987; early copies of the record in the Boston area were packaged with the Weed Forestin'  tape, the first release by Barlow's side project Sebadoh. The album received much more attention in the indie-rock community than the debut. Barlow also composed two songs: the hardcore-influenced "Lose" and an acoustic sonic collage entitled "Poledo" that anticipated his work with Sebadoh.

Name change 
Immediately following the release of You're Living All Over Me, a supergroup called Dinosaurs (featuring ex-members of Country Joe and the Fish, Quicksilver Messenger Service, Hot Tuna, Grateful Dead and Jefferson Airplane) sued Dinosaur over the use of the name, prompting the addition of "Jr."

Bug and Barlow's departure
Dinosaur Jr. had a major breakthrough in the United Kingdom with their debut single for Blast First, "Freak Scene", in 1988, a version with censored lyrics being issued for radio consumption. It reached number 4 in the UK independent chart, staying on the chart for 12 weeks. The band's third album, Bug, followed shortly afterwards, reaching number 1 on the UK independent chart and spending 38 weeks in the chart. The band's first UK singles chart placing came in 1989 with their cover of The Cure's "Just Like Heaven".

Bug was similar in musical style to You're Living All Over Me, with the contrast between the extremely distorted instruments and the melodic vocal parts intact, as was the band's unique blend of musical influences. However, Bug was considered to be more melodic, accompanied by more conventional song structures. Mascis was exhibiting an even tighter control over the band's sound, singing lead vocals on all but one song and composing the parts for Murph and Lou to play. Barlow's only lead vocal was on the album's final track, featuring an overdriven, noise-rock backing track and Barlow screaming "Why don't you like me?"

Mascis has described Bug as his least favorite of the band's albums. In an interview in 2005, after the original line-up had reformed, he said, "Bug is my least favourite of all our records. I like some of the songs but, I dunno, I guess I really don't like the vibe of it."

Despite the album's success, tension between Mascis and Barlow began interfering with the band's productivity. In 1989, after touring in support of Bug, Barlow was kicked out of the band. Barlow now focused all of his attention on the former side-project Sebadoh. "The Freed Pig," the opening track on 1991's Sebadoh III, documents Barlow's frustration with Mascis and feeling of being treated poorly in Dinosaur Jr.

Meanwhile, the band embarked on an Australian tour with Donna Dresch filling in for Barlow. In 1990, the band released a new single, "The Wagon" on Sub Pop, their first release since Barlow's departure. The single featured a short-lived lineup including guitarist Don Fleming and drummer Jay Spiegel from the band Gumball, in addition to Mascis and Murph.

Major label years
Despite the ongoing lineup turmoil, Dinosaur Jr. signed with Sire Records in 1990. They made their major-label debut with Green Mind in 1991. The new record was virtually a J Mascis solo album, with Murph playing drums on only a few songs, as well as minimal contributions from Fleming and Spiegel, who were out of the band by the time the album was released. Mascis, whose first instrument was a drum kit, recorded many of the drum parts by himself, layering the various instrumental parts through overdubbing.

For touring purposes, Mascis first added Van Conner, and then Mike Johnson to handle the bass parts and embarked on several tours to support Green Mind, with support acts that included Nirvana. In 1991, Sire Records released an EP titled Whatever's Cool with Me that featured old B-sides coupled with one new track. In 1992, the band was part of the Rollercoaster Tour, a package tour based on the successful Lollapolooza festival, which featured The Jesus and Mary Chain, My Bloody Valentine, and Blur.

The band found their live shows well received in the changing musical climate of the early 1990s and decided to record new material with the new lineup. This time, the recording sessions were with full participation from Murph and Johnson, with the former playing most of the drums and the latter playing all of the bass parts, singing harmony vocals and even contributing a few guitar solos. This material represented the peak of the band's commercial success, with the single Start Choppin reaching the top 20 in the UK, and the album that followed, Where You Been, reaching the UK top 10 and the US top 50. The opening track, Out There, had an accompanying video and was aired on MTV for a short time, as the show 120 Minutes was still popular as a late-night "alternative" video show. Although their new material was more accessible than the band's 1980s albums, in terms of playing, it represented a partial return to the more unrestrained power-trio sound of the original lineup.

Murph left the band after touring for Where You Been and was replaced for the band's live shows by George Berz, leaving Mascis as the sole remaining original member. However, the band's subsequent albums would be recorded mostly by J Mascis on his own, playing everything except for the bass and some of the harmony vocals, which continued to be handled by Mike Johnson. The commercial success continued with 1994's Without a Sound, which placed well in both the US and UK album charts. After 1997's Hand It Over, Mascis finally retired the Dinosaur Jr. name, with the group's final live performance being an appearance on the American talk show The Jenny Jones Show. In 1999, Mascis released the first of two solo albums under the name J Mascis + The Fog.

2005 reunion and onward
The beginnings of a Mascis–Barlow détente started in the mid-'90s when Mascis began showing up at Sebadoh shows. "I think he was kind of aware of how much shit I was talking about him," Barlow noted in a 2005 interview, "but I don't think he really ever pursued any of it. One of the things that really triggered this, for me to finally just go, 'Hey, you know, maybe this could work,' is when I realized that maybe J wasn't really holding any kind of grudge against me because he didn't like me. I was thinking, maybe he just didn't realize what he had done, or maybe he wasn't really aware of how much he'd actually hurt me. And when I started to realize that, he kind of became more human to me."

In 2002, the two shared the stage for two shows in London, with Barlow singing I Wanna Be Your Dog along with Mascis, Ron Asheton, Scott Asheton and Mike Watt, who had been performing Stooges songs as "Asheton, Asheton, Mascis and Watt".

Mascis regained the master rights to the band's first three albums from SST in 2004 and arranged for their reissue on Merge early 2005. Later that year, he and Barlow shared the stage at a benefit show for autism at Smith College organized by Barlow's mother in Northampton, Massachusetts, and played together as Deep Wound after Mascis and Sebadoh had completed their respective sets.

Following the reissues in 2005, Mascis, Barlow, and Murph finally reunited to play on The Late Late Show with Craig Ferguson on April 15, 2005, and in June that year, they kicked off a tour of Europe. While performing in New York City in 2006, much of the band's equipment was stolen while stored outside their hotel and has not yet been recovered. The band members were later among the curators of 2006's All Tomorrow's Parties festival.

In 2007, the original members of Dinosaur Jr. released Beyond on Fat Possum Records, their first album of new material as a trio since Bug in 1988. It was met with critical acclaim, rating an 8.4 from Pitchfork Media and garnering positive reviews from the music press as a whole. It was considered somewhat of a sonic paradox in that even though it featured the original members who produced "two records so drenched in noise they still sound like aural assaults decades after their original release," sonically it resembled the major label releases of the 1990s in both production values and stylistic range. On the other hand, while the sound was not as extreme as the original lineup's 1980s albums, it did feature a bigger, more unrestrained, and more live-sounding feel than their 1990s albums, though Barlow's bass was noticeably quieter than in the old days. Barlow did make his mark on the music in other ways: for the first time since You're Living All Over Me, he contributed to the songwriting. The album went on to have good commercial success, debuting on the Billboard 200 at number 69 its opening week.

In February 2009, the band signed with indie label Jagjaguwar. The band's first release on the new label was an album titled Farm which was released on June 23, 2009. Murph said the album was recorded at Mascis's home and marks return to the heavier, Where You Been LP era. The album reached number 29 on the Billboard 200, making it the band's highest-charting album in the US. To promote the album, the band played Farm's lead-off track, "Pieces", on Late Night with Jimmy Fallon on June 25, 2009.

Dinosaur Jr. released their second album for Jagjaguwar, I Bet on Sky, in September 2012, to favourable reviews.

In December 2015, Murph confirmed the band had entered the studio to begin working on their follow up to I Bet on Sky. The album Give a Glimpse of What Yer Not was released on August 5, 2016, on Jagjaguwar.

In February 2019, the song "Over Your Shoulder" from the band's 1994 album Without a Sound reached number 18 on Japan's Billboard charts. The cause is suspected to be the song's use on the Japanese TV show called Gachinko Fight Club.

In February 2021, the band announced their 12th album Sweep It Into Space, which was released on April 23, 2021. The album was originally scheduled for release in mid-2020 but was delayed due to the COVID-19 pandemic. The album was preceded by the single "I Ran Away" on February 23, 2021, with a music video for the song being released on March 3, 2021. The second single, "Garden", was released with a music video on March 31, 2021. The band announced a 2021 North American tour to support the album was planned to begin in September 2021 and would conclude in February 2022.

Musical style and influences
Dinosaur Jr has been described as alternative rock, indie rock, noise rock, noise pop, hardcore punk (first albums) and grunge (early nineties).

Dinosaur Jr. is considered to be an alternative rock band; however the band's musical style, compared to its underground contemporaries in the 1980s, differed in several ways. This included the influence of classic rock on the band's music, their use of feedback, extreme volume as well as loud-quiet dynamic, combined with Mascis's droning vocals. A characteristic of Mascis's vocal style is frequent use of vocal fry. Gerald Cosloy, head of Homestead Records, summarised the band's music: "It was its own bizarre hybrid. ... It wasn't exactly pop, it wasn't exactly punk rock—it was completely its own thing".

Mascis listened to classic rock artists such as the Rolling Stones and the Beach Boys, elements of which were incorporated into Dinosaur Jr.'s sound. In addition, Mascis was also a fan of many punk and hardcore bands such as The Birthday Party, and has frequently noted Nick Cave as an influence. Dinosaur Jr. combined elements of hardcore punk and noise rock into their songs, which often featured a large amount of feedback, distortion and extreme volume. When the master tape of You're Living All Over Me arrived at SST, the label's production manager noticed the level on the tape was so high it was distorting; however, Mascis confirmed it was the way he wanted the album to sound.

Similar to Mascis's guitar work, Barlow's bass lines, with their alternating heavily distorted, fast chords and pulverizing lows, draw heavily from both his hardcore past and musicians such as Lemmy and Johnny Ramone. On his influences, Barlow stated that "...Johnny Ramone is my hero. I wanted to make that rhythmic chugging sound like he got playing guitar with the Ramones. And, I found that I got a bigger sound by strumming farther up the neck."

Mascis's vocals are another distinctive feature of Dinosaur Jr.'s music. He attributed his "whiny low-key drawl", the opposite of the hardcore punk "bark", to artists such as John Fogerty and Mick Jagger. His style also resembled Neil Young's, but Mascis disputed this, and later commented: "That got annoying, being compared all the time." His drawl epitomised the band's slacker ethos and relaxed attitude; author Michael Azerrad said "even Mascis seemed removed from the feelings he was conveying in the music."

Legacy
In a BBC review of their reissued albums You're Living All Over Me and Bug, Zoe Street called them "Frighteningly ahead of their time." The Seattle Times called them "one of post-punk’s most influential bands." According to Michael Azerrad:Dinosaur Jr was one of the first, biggest, and best bands among the second generation of indie kids, the ones who took Black Flag and Minor Threat for granted, a generation for whom the Seventies, not the Sixties, was the nostalgic ideal. Their music continued a retrograde stylistic shift in the American underground that the Replacements and other bands had begun: renouncing the antihistorical tendencies of hardcore and fully embracing the music that everyone had grown up on. In particular, Dinosaur singer-guitarist J Mascis achieved the unthinkable in underground rock—he brought back the extended guitar solo.Dinosaur Jr's music has influenced many other musicians such as Kurt Cobain of Nirvana, Billy Corgan of The Smashing Pumpkins, Black Francis of Pixies, Radiohead, Graham Coxon of Blur, Doug Martsch of Built to Spill, Henry Rollins, Tad, Kevin Shields of My Bloody Valentine, Ride, Slowdive, Aidan Moffat of Arab Strap, Swervedriver, Uncle Tupelo, Teenage Fanclub, The Lemonheads, Tom DeLonge of Blink-182, Snow Patrol, Band of Horses, Polvo, and Kurt Vile.

Their album You're Living All Over Me has been called possibly "the first perfect indie rock album." Spin named it one of "The 300 Best Albums of the Past 30 Years (1985–2014)". Pitchfork placed the album at number 40 on its Top 100 Albums of the 1980s list.

Band membersCurrent membersJ Mascis – lead vocals, guitars, keyboards (1984–1997, 2005–present); drums (studio, 1991, 1994–1997)
Lou Barlow – bass, backing and lead vocals (1984–1989, 2005–present)
Murph – drums (1984–1993, 2005–present)Former members'''
Mike Johnson – bass, backing vocals (1991–1997)
George Berz – drums (live, 1993–1997)
Van Conner – bass, backing vocals (live, 1990–1991)
Donna Dresch - bass, backing vocals (live, 1990)

DiscographyDinosaur (1985)You're Living All Over Me (1987)Bug (1988)Green Mind (1991)Where You Been (1993)Without a Sound (1994)Hand It Over (1997)Beyond (2007)Farm (2009)I Bet on Sky (2012)Give a Glimpse of What Yer Not (2016)Sweep It Into Space (2021)

Filmography
2020 Freakscene – The Story of Dinosaur Jr.'' Documentary. Dir.: Philipp Reichenheim

References

Sources

External links

Official Dinosaur Jr. site

Musical groups established in 1984
Musical groups disestablished in 1997
Musical groups reestablished in 2005
American musical trios
Alternative rock groups from Massachusetts
Blanco y Negro Records artists
Homestead Records artists
SST Records artists
Blast First artists
Sire Records artists
Fat Possum Records artists
PIAS Recordings artists
American noise rock music groups
Indie rock musical groups from Massachusetts
Jagjaguwar artists
1984 establishments in Massachusetts
Merge Records artists
Au Go Go Records artists
Love Da Records artists